This is a list of notable Jewish American sportspeople. For other Jewish Americans, see Lists of Jewish Americans; for sportspeople from other countries, see List of Jews in sport.

Baseball

Players

Cal Abrams
Lloyd Allen (converted to Judaism)
Rubén Amaro, Jr. (Jewish mother)
Morrie Arnovich, All Star
Brad Ausmus, catcher, All-Star, 3x Gold Glove
Jesse Baker
Brian Bark
Ross Baumgarten
Jose Bautista (Jewish mother)
Bo Belinsky (Jewish mother)
Joe Bennett
Moe Berg
Richard Bleier, pitcher (Baltimore Orioles)
Bob Berman
Cy Block
Ron Blomberg (1948–), Major League's first designated hitter
Sam Bohne
Lou Boudreau (Jewish mother), 8x All-Star, batting title, MVP, Baseball Hall of Fame, manager
 Ralph Branca, pitcher, 3x All-Star
Ryan Braun, outfielder, 2007 Rookie of the Year, home run champion, 5x All-Star, 5x Silver Slugger, 2011 National League MVP
Alex Bregman, infielder (Houston Astros)
Craig Breslow, pitcher
Louis Brower
Conrad Cardinal
Harry Chozen
 Mark Clear, relief pitcher, 2x All-Star
Tony Cogan
Alta Cohen
Andy Cohen (1904–1988), 2nd baseman for the New York Giants (1926, 1928, 1929); managed one game for the 1960 Philadelphia Phillies
Hy Cohen
Syd Cohen
Phil Cooney

Ed Corey
Bill Cristall
Harry Danning, catcher, 4x All-Star
Ike Davis, first baseman
Cody Decker
Harry Eisenstat
Mike Epstein
Reuben Ewing
Al Federoff
Harry Feldman
Scott Feldman, pitcher
Leo Fishel
Matt Ford
Nate Freiman
Max Fried, pitcher (Atlanta Braves)
Sam Fuld, outfielder and general manager
Brad Goldberg, pitcher (Chicago White Sox)
 Sid Gordon, outfielder & third baseman, 2x All-Star
John Grabow
Shawn Green, right fielder, 2x All-Star, Gold Glove, Silver Slugger

Adam Greenberg (1981–), outfielder with the Chicago Cubs
Hank Greenberg, first baseman & outfielder, 5x All-Star, 4x home run champion, 4x RBI leader, 2x MVP, Baseball Hall of Fame
Mickey Haslin (whose father, George Haslinsky, was a son of Anna née Jaszová)
Jason Hirsh, starting pitcher
Ken Holtzman, starting pitcher, 2x All-Star. pitched two major league no-hitters
 Joe Horlen, pitcher, All-Star, ERA leader
Brian Horwitz, outfielder
Gabe Kapler, outfielder, manager, 2021 NL Manager of the Year

Ty Kelly, utility player
Ian Kinsler, second baseman, 4x All-Star
Jerry Klein, pitcher
Sandy Koufax, starting pitcher, 6x All-Star, 5x ERA leader, 4x strikeouts leader, 3x Wins leader, 2x W-L% leader, 1 perfect game, MVP, 3x Cy Young Award, Baseball Hall of Fame
 Barry Latman, pitcher
Ryan Lavarnway, catcher
 Mike Lieberthal, catcher, 2x All-Star, Gold Glove
Jason Marquis, starting pitcher, Silver Slugger, All Star
 Bob Melvin, catcher & manager of the Oakland Athletics
Marvin Miller, first director of the MLBPA
Jon Moscot, pitcher (Cincinnati Reds)
David Newhan (whose father is Ross Newhan)
Jeff Newman, catcher & first baseman, All-Star, manager
Joc Pederson, outfielder (Los Angeles Dodgers)
Barney Pelty
Lefty Phillips, managed the California Angels in the late 1960s and early 1970s
Lipman Pike, major league baseball's first player. outfielder, second baseman, & manager, 4x home run champion, RBI leader
Kevin Pillar, center fielder
Jake Pitler
Aaron Poreda, pitcher
Scott Radinsky, pitcher
Jimmie Reese
Jerry Reinsdorf, owner, Chicago White Sox
Dave Roberts,  pitcher
Saul Rogovin,  pitcher
Al Rosen, third baseman & first baseman, 4x All-Star, 2x home run champion, 2x RBI leader, MVP
Wayne Rosenthal
Josh Satin, second baseman for the Mets
Richie Scheinblum, outfielder, All-Star
Scott Schoeneweis
Art Shamsky, outfielder and first baseman in the '60s and '70s with the Reds and Mets.
Larry Sherry, relief pitcher for the Dodgers
Norm Sherry, catcher, managed the California Angels
Mose Solomon, "The Rabbi of Swat"
George Stone, outfielder, 1x batting title
Steve Stone, All Star, Cy Young Award

Danny Valencia, third baseman
Steve Wapnick, relief pitcher
Justin Wayne
 Phil Weintraub, nicknamed "Mickey"
Josh Whitesell, first baseman
Steve Yeager, catcher for the Los Angeles Dodgers
Larry Yellen, pitcher for the Houston Colt .45s
Kevin Youkilis, first baseman, third baseman, & left fielder, 3x All-Star, Gold Glove, Hank Aaron Award
Josh Zeid, pitcher

It is often stated incorrectly that Hall of Famer Rod Carew converted to Judaism, although it is true that he married a Jewish woman and they raised their children as Jews. This misconception was most famously perpetuated in two works:
 A 1976 Esquire magazine article, "All-Time All-Star Argument Starter", by sportswriter Harry Stein, himself Jewish. Stein named Carew as the starting second baseman on his All-Jewish team.
 "The Chanukah Song" by Jewish American comedian and actor Adam Sandler. He explicitly stated in his original 1994 version that Carew converted to Judaism, and Sandler has perpetuated this in later versions of the song.

Umpires
Al Clark, Major League Baseball's first Jewish umpire

Basketball

Basketball players

Sam Balter, All American, UCLA; Olympic gold medal at the 1936 Berlin Olympics; longtime radio and TV broadcaster
Irv Bemoras, All American, University of Illinois. Guard/forward, Milwaukee Hawks and St. Louis Hawks
Sue Bird, NCAA player of the year, University of Connecticut; 11 time All Star with the WNBA's Seattle Storm; 4 Olympic gold medals; 4 World Cup gold medals
David Blu, forward, University of Southern California. Played in Euroleague, including 5 seasons with Maccabi Tel Aviv
Omri Casspi, 1st Israeli-born NBA draft pick; forward for 8 NBA teams as well as Maccabi Tel Aviv 
Jake Cohen, American-Israeli power forward for Maccabi Tel Aviv and the Israeli national basketball team
Shay Doron, All Conference, University of Maryland. Shooting guard, WNBA's New York Liberty and the Israeli League
Jordan Farmar, All Conference, UCLA. Guard, Los Angeles Lakers, New Jersey Nets, and Maccabi Tel Aviv
Hank Finkel, All American, the University of Dayton. Center, Los Angeles Lakers, San Diego Rockets, and the Boston Celtics
Marty Friedman, pre-NBA player for such teams as the New York Whirlwinds and Cleveland Rosenblums. Naismith Hall of Fame.
Doug Gottlieb, led NCAA in assists, Oklahoma State. Played Euroleague. Basketball analyst, ESPN, CBS Sports, Fox Sports.
Art Heyman, NCAA player of the year, Duke; forward for the New York Knicks and the ABA's Pittsburgh Pipers. William "red" holtzman player and coach, Naismith HOF 1986, 2x NBA Championship coach
Nate Huffman, center, Central Michigan University, NBA's Toronto Raptors. Suproleague player of the year, Maccabi Tel Aviv
Ralph Kaplowitz, All American, NYU; guard, Philadelphia Sphas, New York Knicks, Philadelphia Warriors. Started in the first NBA/BAA game (Knicks vs. Huskies)
Barry Kramer, All-American NYU; forward, NBA's San Francisco Warriors, New York Knicks
Joel Kramer, all conference, San Diego State; forward for Phoenix Suns and Maccabi Tel Aviv.
Sylven Landesberg, All ACC, UVA; guard, Maccabi Tel Aviv and EuroLeague
Rudy LaRusso, All Ivy, Dartmouth College, five-time NBA All Star, Los Angeles Lakers
Nancy Lieberman, NCAA player of the year, Old Dominion University; professional point guard, pre-WNBA, as well as for Phoenix Mercury. Coach and GM, WNBA's Detroit Shock. Assistant coach, NBA's Sacramento Kings. Television analyst, NBA basketball. Naismith Hall of Fame.
Lennie Rosenbluth, All American, University of North Carolina, Chapel Hill. Forward, Philadelphia Warriors
Danny Schayes, center, Syracuse University; 18 seasons in NBA, 8 with Denver Nuggets
Dolph Schayes, All American, NYU.  12-time All-NBA team, Syracuse Nationals. Naismith Hall of Fame.
Ossie Schectman, guard, Long Island University. Guard, Philadelphia Sphas and New York Knicks. Scored first basket of BAA/NBA.
Jon Scheyer, All-American Duke University, head coach, Duke, effective 2022
Barney Sedran, guard CCNY; pre-NBA star for many teams, including the Cleveland Rosenblums. Shortest player in the Naismith Hall of Fame.
Amar'e Stoudemire, power forward, New York Knicks; claims to have Jewish roots, but this is unconfirmed
Sidney Tanenbaum, All-American, NYU; guard for BAA/NBA's New York Knicks and Baltimore Bullets.
 Ryan Turell (born 1999), basketball player for the G-League Motor City Cruise, Yeshiva University.
Alex Tyus, center, Israeli national team 
Neal Walk, All American, University of Florida. NBA center, mostly with the Phoenix Suns
 Max Zaslofsky, guard/forward, St. John's University, Chicago Stags, New York Knicks; named to 1st 4 All-NBA teams

Basketball administrators, coaches, and owners
Senda Berenson Abbott, basketball educator, Naismith Hall of Fame
Leslie Alexander, owner, Houston Rockets; former owner, Houston Comets
Micky Arison, owner, Miami Heat
Red Auerbach, coach, general manager and team president, Boston Celtics; 16 NBA championships. Naismith Hall of Fame.
Steve Ballmer, owner, Los Angeles Clippers
Steve Belkin, former owner, Atlanta Hawks
David Blatt, coach, Cleveland Cavaliers
Larry Brown, coach, 8 NBA teams, University of Kansas, SMU. Point guard, University of North Carolina and 4 teams in the American Basketball Association. Olympic gold medal. Naismith Hall of Fame.
Mark Cuban, owner, Dallas Mavericks
William Davidson, former owner, Detroit Pistons. Naismith Hall of Fame.
Lawrence Frank, coach, New Jersey Nets
Larry Fleisher, president and general counsel to the National Basketball Association Players' Association. Naismith Hall of Fame.
Dan Gilbert, owner, Cleveland Cavaliers
Edward Gottlieb, NBA co-founder, coach and owner of Philadelphia/San Francisco Warriors, Naismith Hall of Fame.
Ernie Grunfeld, general manager, New York Knicks and Milwaukee Bucks;  president, Washington Wizards. All-time leading scorer, University of Tennessee. Olympic gold medal. Guard, New York Knicks, Milwaukee Bucks, and Kansas City Kings
Peter Guber, owner, Golden State Warriors, with Joe Lacob
Nat Holman, coach, City College of New York, NCAA and NIT championships in same year. Guard, NYU Violets, Original Celtics. Naismith Hall of Fame.
Red Holzman, coach, New York Knicks, 2 NBA championships. All American, City College of New York. Guard, Rochester Royals, Kansas City Royals, Milwaukee Hawks. Naismith Hall of Fame.
George Kaiser, owner, Oklahoma City Thunder
Louis Klotz, player/coach/manager for the Washington Generals and New York Nationals as they lost 14,000 exhibition games to the Harlem Globetrotters; guard, Philadelphia Sphas and Baltimore Bullets
Herb Kohl, former owner, Milwaukee Bucks
Joe Lacob, owner, Golden State Warriors, with Peter Guber
Guy Lewis, coach, University of Houston. Naismith Hall of Fame.
Harry Litwack, coach, Temple University. Player, Philadelphia Sphas. Naismith Hall of Fame.
Stan Kasten, general manager/president, Atlanta Hawks
Bruce Pearl, coach, University of Tennessee, Auburn University (current)
Maurice Podoloff, former NBA commissioner 
Mikhail Prokhorov, owner, Brooklyn Nets, with Bruce Ratner
Jerry Reinsdorf, owner, Chicago Bulls, Naismith Hall of Fame
Antony Ressler, owner, Atlanta Hawks
Abe Saperstein, founder, owner, and earliest coach, Harlem Globetrotters. Shortest man in the Naismith Hall of Fame
Robert Sarver, owner, Phoenix Suns
Howard Schultz, former owner Seattle SuperSonics and Seattle Storm
Jon Scheyer, coach and former All American player, Duke University
Adam Silver, current NBA commissioner
Herb Simon, owner, Indiana Pacers
Mel Simon, former co-owner, Indiana Pacers
Donald Sterling, former owner, Los Angeles Clippers
David Stern, former NBA commissioner. Naismith Hall of Fame.
Zollie Volchok, former general manager, Seattle SuperSonics
Larry Weinberg, former owner, Portland Trail Blazers

Boxing

Ray Arcel, trainer, HoF
Bob Arum, promoter, HoF
Abe Attell, world featherweight champion, HoF
Max Baer, world heavyweight champion, HoF
Benny Bass, world featherweight champion, HoF
Samuel Berger, first Olympic heavyweight champion
Jack Bernstein, world junior lightweight champion
Mushy Callahan, world junior-welterweight champion, HoF
Joe Choynski, heavyweight fighter, HoF
Al "Bummy" Davis, "The Brownsville Bum"; controversial lightweight and welterweight boxer of the 1930s and 1940s<ref>..."You want to make money fighting, don't you? People like to come to fights to see guys they think are tough." So Davis became known as Bummy, though he was not a bum, either as a boxer or as a person. His tragic — and violent — death was indicative of the way he lived his life. In 1945, at the age of 25, Davis was fatally shot to death while coming to the defense of a barkeep during a robbery attempt.</r></ref>
Yuri Foreman, super welterweight champion
Benny Goldberg, bantamweight amateur turned pro
Charley Goldman, trainer, HoF
Abe Goldstein, world bantamweight champion
Ronnie Harris, three-time U.S. National Lightweight Champion; gold medalist in Boxing at the 1968 Summer Olympics
Mike Jacobs, promoter, HoF
Ben Jeby, world middleweight champion
Jackie Kallen, promoter
Kid Kaplan, world featherweight champion, HoF
Solly Krieger, world middleweight champion
Herbie Kronowitz, middleweight champion, ranked tenth in the world in the 1940s, native of Brooklyn, New York, later a boxing referee
Benny Leonard, world lightweight champion, HoF
Battling Levinsky, world light-heavyweight champion, HoF
 Greg Lobel, heavyweight
Saoul Mamby, world junior-welterweight champion
Al McCoy, world welterweight champion
Boyd Melson, 2008 Olympic alternate and current professional junior middleweight boxer; donates 100% of his fight purses to spinal cord injury research
Samuel Mosberg, Olympic light-heavyweight gold medalist at the 1920 Olympics where he scored the quickest knock-out in history
 Bob Olin, world light-heavyweight champion
Charlie Phil Rosenberg, world bantamweight champion
Dana Rosenblatt, world middleweight champion
Maxie Rosenbloom, world light-heavyweight champion, HoF
Barney Ross, world lightweight and welterweight champion, HoF
Mike Rossman, world light-heavyweight champion
Dmitriy Salita, Brooklyn boxer, born April 4, 1982
Corporal Izzy Schwartz, world flyweight champion
 Abe Simon, last Jewish contender for world heavyweight title
Al Singer, world lightweight champion, HoF
Lew Tendler, "greatest southpaw in ring history", HoF
Benny Valger, nicknamed "The French Flash"

Equestrian

Robert Dover, 4x Olympic bronze, 1x world championship bronze (dressage)
Margie Goldstein-Engle, world championship silver, Pan American Games gold, silver, and bronze (jumping)
Edith Master, Olympic bronze (dressage)

Fencing

Norman Armitage, fencer; ten-time US sabre champion
Albert Axelrod, fencer; four-time US foil champion, and Olympic bronze medalist
Cliff Bayer, fencer; four-time US foil champion
Tamir Bloom, fencer; two-time US epee champion
Daniel Bukantz, fencer; four-time US foil champion; gold medalist in 1950 Maccabiah Games
Emily Jacobson, fencer; 2004 Women's World Sabre Junior Champion
Sada Jacobson, fencer; Olympic bronze medalist; ranked #1 in the world in 2004
Dan Kellner, fencer; one-time US foil champion
 Byron Krieger, (foil, saber, épée), 2x Olympian, Pan American Games team gold/silver
Allan Kwartler, fencer; gold medalist in the Pan American Games (sabre) and Maccabiah Games (sabre and foil)
Helene Mayer, fencer; four-time Women's World Foil Champion; 8-time US champion; and Olympic gold and silver medalist
Soren Thompson (épée), NCAA champion, world team champion
Jonathan Tiomkin, fencer; two-time US foil champion
George Worth, fencer; one-time US sabre champion; Olympic bronze and silver medalist

American football

Players
Doc Alexander, G, All-Pro, College Football Hall of Fame (CFHoF)
Lyle Alzado, DE, two-time All-Pro
Julian Edelman (Jewish father. Family became Anusim due to Anti Semitism in Imperial Russia.)
Harris Barton, OL, two-time All-Pro
Alex Bernstein, OL
David Binn, long snapper, San Diego Chargers
Jeremy Bloom, WR, PR
Matt Bloom, G, T
Arthur Bluethenthal, C
Greg Camarillo, WR, Minnesota Vikings
Gabe Carimi, OT, Chicago Bears
Irv Constantine, B, Staten Island Stapletons
Al Cornsweet, Cleveland Browns
Julian Edelman, WR, New England Patriots
Jay Fiedler, QB
Colin Ritter, P
John Frank, TE
Benny Friedman, QB, four-time All-Pro, Hall of Fame, CFHoF
Lennie Friedman, OL, Cleveland Browns
Antonio Garay, DT, San Diego Chargers
Adam Goldberg, OG, St. Louis Rams
Bill Goldberg, DT
Marshall Goldberg, RB, All-Pro, CFHoF
Charles "Buckets" Goldenberg, G and RB, All-Pro
Randy Grossman, TE, Pittsburgh Steelers
Phil Handler, G, three-time All-Pro
Sigmund Harris, QB
Mark Herzlich, LB, New York Giants
Greg Joseph, K
Andrew Kline, OG
Kyle Kosier, G, Dallas Cowboys
Len Levy, G
Benny Lom
Erik Lorig, FB/TE, Tampa Bay Buccaneers
Sid Luckman,  QB, 8-time All-Pro, Hall of Fame, CFHoF
Taylor Mays, S, Cincinnati Bengals
Sam McCullum, WR
Josh Miller, punter
Ron Mix, OT, nine-time All-Pro, Hall of Fame
Ed Newman, G, All-Pro
Harry Newman, QB, All-Pro
Igor Olshansky, DE
Adam Podlesh, punter
Merv Pregulman, T and C
Herb Rich, safety, All-Pro
Josh Rosen, QB, Miami Dolphins
Sage Rosenfels, QB, New York Giants
Mike Rosenthal, OT
Jack Sack, All-Pro
Geoff Schwartz, OT, New York Giants
Mitchell Schwartz. OT
Mike Seidman, TE, Indianapolis Colts
Allie Sherman, running back and coach
Saul "Solly" Sherman, Chicago Bears, QB, 1939 and 1940
Scott Slutzker, TE
Josh Taves, DE
Andre Tippett, LB, five-time All Pro, Hall of Fame (converted to Judaism)
Alan Veingrad, OL
Gary Wood, New York Giants QB

Coaches
Al Cornsweet, coach Cleveland Browns 1931
Jedd Fisch, offensive coordinator of the UCLA Bruins
Sid Gillman, coach, PFHoF, CFHoF
Phil Handler, head coach of the Chicago Cardinals
Tony Levine, head coach of the Houston Cougars
Marv Levy, coach, PFHoF
Allie Sherman, former head coach of the New York Giants
Marc Trestman, former head coach of the Chicago Bears

Executives
David Tepper, NFL franchise owner, Carolina Panthers (2018–present)
Arthur Blank, NFL franchise owner, Atlanta Falcons (2002–present)
Al Davis, NFL franchise owner, Oakland Raiders (1966–2011)
Mark Davis, NFL franchise owner, Oakland/Las Vegas Raiders (2011–present)
Malcolm Glazer, NFL franchise owner, Tampa Bay Buccaneers (1995–present)
Eugene V. Klein, NFL franchise owner, San Diego Chargers (1966–84)
Robert Kraft, NFL franchise owner, New England Patriots (1994–present)
Randy Lerner, NFL franchise owner, Cleveland Browns (2002–12)
Jeffrey Lurie, NFL franchise owner, Philadelphia Eagles (1995–present)
Art Modell, NFL franchise owner, Cleveland Browns (1961–95), and Baltimore Ravens (1995–2004)
Carroll Rosenbloom, NFL franchise owner, Baltimore Colts (1953–1972), and Los Angeles Rams (1972–1979)
Stephen M. Ross, NFL Franchise owner, Miami Dolphins (2008–present)
Daniel Snyder, NFL franchise owner, Washington Commanders (1999–present)
Steve Tisch, NFL franchise owners, New York Giants (2005–present)
Sonny Werblin, NFL franchise owner, New York Jets (1965–68)
Zygi Wilf, NFL franchise owner, Minnesota Vikings

Officials
Jerry Markbreit, line judge (1976) and referee (1977–98); only official to serve as referee in four Super Bowls (XVII, XXI, XXVI, XXIX)

Golf

Amy Alcott, LPGA Tour, World Golf Hall of Fame
Herman Barron, PGA Tour
Daniel Berger, PGA Tour
Bruce Fleisher, PGA Tour
Jonathan Kaye, PGA Tour
David Lipsky, Asian Tour
Corey Pavin, PGA & Champions Tour (converted to Christianity)
Morgan Pressel, LPGA Tour
Monte Scheinblum, 1992 US and World Long Drive Champion
Ron Silver, Nationwide Tour
Patrick Rodgers, PGA Tour

Gymnastics

 Alyssa Beckerman, national champion (balance beam), 2 silver & bronze (uneven bars)
 Philip Erenberg, Olympic silver (Indian clubs)
 Mitch Gaylord, Olympic champion (team), silver (vaulting), 2x bronze (rings, parallel bars)
 Abie Grossfeld, 8 time Pan American champion, 7x Maccabiah champion, coach
 George Gulack, Olympic champion (flying rings)
 Phoebe Mills, Olympic bronze (balance beam)
Aly Raisman, Olympic champion (floor, team combined exercises in 2012 and 2016), silver (all-around), bronze (balance beam); world gold (team: 2011, 2015), silver (team: 2010), and bronze (floor exercise: 2011)
 Kerri Strug, Olympic champion (team combined exercises), bronze (team combined exercises)
 Julie Zetlin, 2010 US champion (rhythmic gymnastics)
 Valerie Zimring, 1984 US National Champion, 5 time Maccabiah Champion (rhythmic gymnastics)

Ice hockey

Mike Brown, right wing 
 Hy Buller, Canadian-born US, All-Star defenceman (NHL)
Carter Camper, forward
Colby Cohen, defenseman
Corey Crawford, goaltender (Chicago Blackhawks)
Sara DeCosta, goaltender (US national team)
Adam Fox, defenseman, (New York Rangers)
Dov Grumet-Morris, goaltender (Hartford Wolf Pack)
Jeff Halpern, center (Phoenix Coyotes)
Mike Hartman, left wing (NHL)
Jack Hughes, center (New Jersey Devils)
Luke Hughes, defenseman (New Jersey Devils)
Quinn Hughes, defenseman (Vancouver Canucks)
Evan Kaufmann, forward (Nürnberg Ice Tigers)
 Luke Kunin, centre, (San Jose Sharks)
Eric Nystrom, left wing (Nashville Predators) & son of former NHL player Bob Nystrom
Dylan Reese, defenseman (Amur Khabarovsk)
Mathieu Schneider, defenseman (NHL)
Brett Sterling, left wing
Jason Zucker, left wing (Pittsburgh Penguins)

Motor sports
Kenny Bernstein, drag racer
Paul Newman, auto racer and team owner
Peter Revson, F1 racer
Mauri Rose, Indy 500 racer

Power sports
Isaac Berger, Olympic weightlifter (1g2s)
Matt Bloom, professional wrestler
Colt Cabana, professional wrestler
Abe Coleman, professional wrestler
Maxwell Jacob Friedman, professional wrestler
Bill Goldberg, professional wrestler
Kelly Kelly (Barbie Blank), professional wrestler
Butch Levy, professional wrestler

Scott Levy, professional wrestler
Dean Malenko, professional wrestler
Lanny Poffo, professional wrestler
Randy Savage, professional wrestler
Izzy Slapawitz, professional wrestler and manager
Henry Wittenberg, Olympic wrestler (1g1s)

Rugby union
 Samuel Goodman, manager of the gold winning US Olympic rugby, 1920, 1924.
 Shawn Lipman
 Zack Test

Skating
Benjamin Agosto, ice dancer
Judy Blumberg, US ice dancer, World Championship three-time bronze
Cindy Bortz, figure skater, World Junior Champion
Sasha Cohen, figure skater, reigning US Figure Skating Champion and Olympic silver
Amber Corwin, figure skater
Loren Galler-Rabinowitz, ice dancer, competes with partner David Mitchell; US Championships bronze
Melissa Gregory, figure skater, ice dancer with Denis Petukhov, US Championships three silvers, two bronze
Emily Hughes, figure skater, World Junior Figure Skating Championships bronze, US Championships bronze, silver
Sarah Hughes, figure skater, Olympic gold, World Championship bronze
Ronald Joseph, figure skater, US Junior Champion, US Championships gold, two-time silver, and bronze, World Championship silver, bronze
Vivian Joseph, figure skater, US Junior Champion, US Championships gold, two-time silver, and bronze, World Championship silver, bronze
Michael Seibert, ice dancer, US Figure Skating Championships five-time gold, World Figure Skating Championships three-time bronze
Jamie Silverstein, figure skater, ice dancer with Ryan O'Meara, US Championships bronze

Soccer (association football)

Ryan Adeleye, US/Israel, defender (Hapoel Be'er Sheva)
Jeff Agoos, defender (national team)
Al Albert, college soccer coach
Kyle Altman, defender 
Yael Averbuch, midfielder (Sky Blue FC and women's national team)
Rhett Bernstein, defender 
Jonathan Bornstein, left back/midfielder (Chicago Fire FC and national team)
Dan Calichman, defender
Benny Feilhaber, Brazil/US center/attacking midfielder (AGF Aarhus and US national team)
Don Garber, commissioner
Avram Glazer, co-chairman, Manchester United
Joel Glazer, co-chairman, Manchester United
Malcolm Glazer, owner, Manchester United
Eddy Hamel, right winger (AFC Ajax; was killed by the Nazis in Auschwitz)
Shep Messing, goalkeeper (national team), manager, and sportscaster
Charlie Reiter, forward (Richmond Kickers)
Dave Sarachan, forward
Sara Whalen, defender/forward, Olympic silver
Ethan Zohn
De Andre yedlin(soccer player, Miami FC) 
Kyle beckerman ( former player for salt lake ) http://www.jewornotjew.com/profile.jsp?ID=1875

Swimming

Tiffany Cohen, Olympic swimmer (2g; 400-meter and 800-meter freestyle)
Anthony Ervin, Olympic swimmer (3g1s)
Scott Goldblatt, US Olympic champion (4X200 freestyle relay), silver (800 m. freestyle relay)
Lenny Krayzelburg, Four time Olympic champion
Dan Kutler, US-born Israeli
Jason Lezak, Olympic swimmer (4g1s2b)
Marilyn Ramenofsky, US Olympic silver (400-meter freestyle)
Keena Rothhammer, Olympic swimmer (1g1b)
Albert Schwartz, US Olympic bronze (100-meter freestyle)
Mark Spitz (1950–), Olympic swimmer (9g1s1b),
Dara Torres, Olympic swimmer (4g4s4b)
Garrett Weber-Gale, Olympic swimmer (2g)
Wendy Weinberg, US Olympic bronze (800-meter freestyle)
Ben Wildman-Tobriner, Olympic swimmer (1g)

Tennis and racquet sports

Jay Berger, tennis player; USTA boys' 18s singles champion, highest world ranking #7; coach
Madison Brengle
Audra Cohen, 2007 NCAA Women's Singles Champion
Julia Cohen, USTA girls' 12s and 18s singles champion
Herbert Flam, two-time USTA boys' 18s singles champion, highest world ranking #5
Zack Fleishman, tennis player
Brad Gilbert, tennis player; highest world ranking #4, Olympic bronze (singles);  coach
Justin Gimelstob, tennis player; USTA boys' 16s and 18s singles champion, won 1998 Australian Open Mixed Doubles (with Venus Williams) and 1998 French Open Mixed Doubles (with Venus Williams)
Paul Goldstein, tennis player; USTA boys' 16s and two-time 18s singles champion
Brian Gottfried, tennis player; USTA boys' 12s and two-time 18s singles champion, won 1975 and 1977 French Open Men's Doubles (with Raúl Ramírez), and 1976 Wimbledon Men's Doubles (with Ramirez), highest world ranking #3
Jim Grabb, doubles tennis player; won 1989 French Open Men's Doubles (with Richey Reneberg) and 1992 US Open Men's Doubles (with Patrick McEnroe), highest world doubles ranking #1
Julie Heldman, US girls' 15s and 18s singles champion, highest world ranking #5
Marty Hogan, racquetball player
Anita Kanter, US girls' 18s singles champion
Aaron Krickstein, tennis player; USTA boys' 16s and 18s singles champion, highest world ranking #6
Steve Krulevitz, tennis player; Maccabbi Champion
Jesse Levine, tennis player
Victor Niederhoffer, squash player; won 1951 Wimbledon Men's Singles, highest world ranking #2
Wayne Odesnik
Richard Savitt, tennis player
Julius Seligson, two-time boys' 18s singles champion
Harold Solomon, tennis player; US boys' 18s singles champion, highest world ranking #5
Brian Teacher, US boys' 18s singles champion, won 1980 Australian Open Singles, highest world ranking #7
Eliot Teltscher, won 1983 French Open Mixed Doubles (with Barbara Jordan), highest world ranking #6

Track and field 

Gerry Ashworth, world record holder in 100 yards, 100 meters; 1964 Olympic track athlete-gold medal
Louis Clarke, Olympic gold medal, 4X100-meter relay
Lillian Copeland, world records (javelin, discus throw, and shot put); Olympic champion & silver {discus}
Daniel Frank, long jump, Olympic silver medal
Hugo Friend, long jump, Olympic bronze medal
James Fuchs, shot put & discus, 2x Olympic bronze (shot put); 4x shot put world record holder, 2x Pan American champions (shot put & discus)
Marty Glickman, sprinter, US Olympic team; All American (football) and sportscaster.
Milton Green, world record holder in the 45-yard & 60-m high hurdles in the 1930s; was considered sure to make the Olympic team in 1936, but chose not to participate in protest of the event being held in Nazi Germany
 Gary Gubner, world shot put records, weightlifter
Clare Jacobs, bronze medal, Olympic pole vault, world indoor record
Deena Kastor, Olympic bronze medalist in marathon 2004 Summer Olympics in Athens; long-distance runner, US records (marathon & half-marathon)
Abel Kiviat, middle-distance runner
Margaret Bergmann Lambert, US Champion in high jump, 1937–38, and shot put, 1938; subject of HBO documentary Hitler's Pawn
 Henry Laskau, German-born US racewalker, won 42 national titles; Pan American champion; 4x Maccabiah champion
Alvah Meyer, silver medal, 100 meter dash, 1912 Olympics, 2 world records (60 y & 300 y).
 Lon Myers, US, sprinter, world records (quarter-mile, 100-yard, and 880-yard)
Myer Prinstein, Olympic jumper, world record (long jump); 3x Olympic champion (2x triple jump & long jump) and silver (long jump) (4g1s)
Steve Seymour, javelin throw, Olympic silver medal
 Sam Stoller, US, world indoor record (60-yard dash)
 Dwight Stones, world record (high jump); 2x Olympic bronze

Horse racing
Barry Abrams, trainer
Walter Blum, Hall of Fame jockey
Robert J. Frankel, Hall of Fame trainer
Willie Harmatz, jockey
John Hertz, owner and breeder
Max Hirsch, Hall of Fame trainer
William J. Hirsch, Hall of Fame trainer
David Hofmans, trainer
Hirsch Jacobs, Hall of Fame trainer
Bruce N. Levine, trainer
Walter Miller, Hall of Fame jockey
Howard M. Tesher, trainer
Martin D. Wolfson, trainer

Miscellaneous sports
Marv Albert, NBA announcer, New York Knicks, NBA on NBC, NBA on TNT, New Jersey Nets
Jeremy Bloom, Olympic freestyle skier; model; NFL player
Walter Blum, jockey
Lindsey Durlacher, wrestler
Sidney Franklin, bullfighter
Alan Gelfand, skateboarder, inventor of the ollie
Martin "Marty" Glickman, track and field athlete and sports announcer
Vic Hershkowitz, handball champion
Marshall Holman, bowling champion
Jordan Levine, lacrosse player
Johnny Most, NBA announcer, Boston Celtics 
Sam Munchnick, wrestling promoter and executive
Marty Nothstein, cyclist
Adam Duvendeck, Olympic cyclist 
Bruce Pasternack, former president and CEO of Special Olympics International.
Mark Roth, bowling champion
Louis O. Schwartz, President, American Sportscasters Association (ASA); founder, ASA Hall of Fame; Editor, ASA Insiders Sportsletter; former president, Finger Lakes Broadcasting Corp.
Tamara Statman, softball player and Israeli National Softball Team Member. 
Shaun Tomson, surfer

See also
List of Jewish chess players
List of Jews in sports
Jewish Sports Review
International Jewish Sports Hall of Fame
U.S. National Jewish Sports Hall of Fame and Museum
Jewish Coaches Association

References

Sportspeople
Lists of sportspeople